ACC Emerging Teams Asia Cup is a men's List-A cricket tournament. It was created by the Asian Cricket Council to develop the talents of the most prominent young cricketers of Asia.

Results

Tournament summary
The table below provides an overview of the performances of teams over past tournaments.

Teams Performance
An overview of the teams' performances in every Asia Cup:

Debutant teams in Main Tournament

See also 

 Asia Cup
 ACC Under-19 Cup

References

Cricket in Asia

External links